Wild at Heart may refer to:

Film and television
 Wild at Heart (Mexican TV series), a 2013 Mexican telenovela
 Wild at Heart (UK TV series), a British drama about an animal hospital/game reserve in South Africa
 Wild at Heart (film), a 1990 film by David Lynch, adapted from the novel by Barry Gifford
 "Wild at Heart" (Buffy the Vampire Slayer), a 1999 episode of the TV series Buffy the Vampire Slayer

Literature
 Wild at Heart (novel), a 1990 novel by Barry Gifford about two young lovers on the run in southern USA
 Wild at Heart (book), a 2001 book by John Eldredge about masculinity in evangelical Christianity
 Vet Volunteers, a children's book series originally published as Wild at Heart

Music
 Wild at Heart (album), a 2001 album by Beccy Cole
 "Wild at Heart" (Gloriana song), 2009
 "Wild at Heart" (Birds of Tokyo song), 2010
 "Wild at Heart" (Arashi song), 2012
"Wild at Heart", a single from singer Lari White's album Don't Fence Me In
"Wild at Heart", a song from the Lana Del Rey album Chemtrails over the Country Club

See also
Wild Heart (disambiguation)